Lisa Jacobs (born ) is an Australian female cyclo-cross cyclist. She was the Australian National Cyclocross Champion in 2013, 2013 and 2015. She competed in the women's elite event at the 2016 UCI Cyclo-cross World Championships  in Heusden-Zolder.

References

External links
 Profile at cyclingarchives.com
 Lisa Jacobs at procyclingstats.com
 Lisa Jacobs | Cyclocross racer at ridehappy.com.au

1981 births
Living people
Cyclo-cross cyclists
Australian female cyclists
Place of birth missing (living people)
20th-century Australian women
21st-century Australian women